First to Die is a 2003 television miniseries based on the 2001 novel of the same name by James Patterson. The film stars Tracy Pollan, Pam Grier, Angie Everhart and Carly Pope as a group of women team up to investigate a string of murders.

Plot
Homicide inspector Lindsay Boxer (Tracy Pollan) teams up with three other professional women to investigate a serial killer who targets brides on their honeymoon. While trying to solve the biggest case of her career, she finds herself falling for her partner (Gil Bellows) and battling a life-threatening illness.

Cast
 Tracy Pollan as Detective Lindsay Boxer
 Gil Bellows as Chris Raleigh
 Carly Pope as Cindy Thomas
 Megan Gallagher as Jill Barnett
 Angie Everhart as Chessy Jenks
 Mitch Pileggi as Warren Jacobi
 Sean Young as Joanna Wade
 Jerry Wasserman as Lt. Roth
 Pam Grier as Claire Washburn
 Byron Mann as Derek Lee
 Robert Patrick as Nicholas Jenks
 Kristina Copeland as Merrill Cale
 John Reardon as David Brandt
 Sonya Salomaa as Melanie Brandt
 L. Harvey Gold as Gerald Brandt
 Clint Carlton as Phillip Campbell
 Chiara Zanni as Heather Tibbs
 Warren Christie as Michael DeGraaff
 Marnie Alton as Kathy Kogut
 Ben Cotton as James Voskul
 Veena Sood as Dr. Veena Yandro

External links
 

2003 television films
2003 films
Films based on American novels
Films based on crime novels
NBC network original films
American police detective films
American serial killer films
Films directed by Russell Mulcahy
2000s American television miniseries
Crime television films
American thriller television films
2000s American films